Hodoxenus is a monotypic genus of rove beetle, containing one species, Hodoxenus sheasbyi, and is the only genus in the subtribe Hodoxenina.

It imitates the termite species Microhodotermes viator (family Hodotermitidae). Hodoxenus imitates these termites, so the termites give Hodoxenus food and shelter. The only known location of the species is in the Cape Province in South Africa.

References

Monotypic Aleocharinae genera
Beetles described in 1970